LNS may refer to:

 East Lansing (Amtrak station),  Amtrak station code
 L2TP Network Server in Layer 2 Tunneling Protocol VPNs
 Lancaster Airport (Pennsylvania), US, IATA code
 Lesch–Nyhan syndrome, an inherited genetic disorder
 League of National Security, a 1930s Australian far-right group also known as the White Army
 Liberation News Service, a former American underground press news agency 
 Local nonsatiation, a property in microeconomics
 Logarithmic number system, an arithmetic system used for representing real numbers in digital hardware